Tri-City Airport may refer to:

 Tri-City Airport (Kansas) in Parsons, Kansas, United States (FAA: PPF)
 Tri-City Airport (Sebring, Ohio) in Mahoning County, Ohio, United States (FAA: 3G6)
 Tri-City Airport (West Lafayette, Ohio) in Coshocton County, Ohio, United States (FAA: 80G)
 Tri-City Airport, San Bernardino in San Bernardino, California
 MBS International Airport in Freeland, Michigan, United States, formerly known as Tri City Airport (FAA: MBS)

See also
Tri-Cities Airport (disambiguation)